Ciudad Arce is a municipality in the La Libertad department of El Salvador. It is named after Manuel José Arce.

Municipalities of the La Libertad Department (El Salvador)